Kaaper or Ka’aper, also commonly known as Sheikh el-Beled, was an ancient Egyptian scribe and priest who lived between the late 4th Dynasty and the early 5th Dynasty (around 2500 BCE). Despite his rank not being among the highest, he is well-known due to his famously fine wooden statue.

Career and life
Little is known of Kaaper's life. His titles were lector priest and army scribe of the King, the latter possibly linked to some military campaigns in the Southern Levant.

Discovery
His mastaba, a flat-roofed tomb (named "Saqqara C8") was discovered by Auguste Mariette in the Saqqara necropolis, just north of the Step Pyramid of Djoser. During the excavation, the Egyptian diggers unearthed the statue and, apparently impressed by its exceptional realism, they called it Sheikh el-Beled (Arabic for "Headman of the village") likely because of a certain similarity between the statue and their local elder.

Description
The statue's round, peaceful face is almost lifelike thanks to the eyes, which were made using rock crystal and small copper plates; it is often cited as an example of the remarkable level of craftmanship and realism achieved during the late 4th Dynasty. From the same mastaba also came a wooden statue of a woman, commonly considered to be Kaaper's wife (CG 33).

See also
 List of ancient Egyptian scribes
Art of ancient Egypt

References

Further reading

People of the Fourth Dynasty of Egypt
People of the Fifth Dynasty of Egypt
Ancient Egyptian priests
Ancient Egyptian scribes